Yasir Abdullah (born April 12, 2000) is an American football linebacker. He played college football at Louisville.

Early life
Abdullah attended Miami Carol City Senior High School in Miami Gardens, Florida. During his high school career he had 137 tackles and 20 sacks. He committed to the University of Louisville to play college football.

College career
Abdullah played in 11 games and had eight tackles as a true freshman at Louisville in 2018. In 2019, he started eight of 13 games, recording 45 tackles, one sack and one interception. He started seven of 11 games in 2020, finishing with 33 tackles and three sacks. Abdullah led Louisville in sacks in 2021 with 10 and had 61 tackles. He returned to Louisville in 2022 rather than enter the 2022 NFL Draft. He finished the year with 63 tackles, 9.5 sacks and two interceptions.

References

External links
Louisville Cardinals bio

2000 births
Living people
Players of American football from Florida
American football linebackers
Louisville Cardinals football players